Xysta is a genus of parasitic flies in the family Tachinidae. There are at least two described species in Xysta.

Species
These two species belong to the genus Xysta:
 Xysta holosericea (Fabricius, 1805)
 Xysta incana Suster, 1929

References

Further reading

 
 
 
 

Tachinidae
Articles created by Qbugbot